Thayagon may refer to:

Thayagon (24°28"N 95°39"E), Banmauk Township, Sagaing Region, Burma
Thayagon (24°26"N 95°37"E), Banmauk Township, Sagaing Region, Burma
Thayagon (25°18"N 95°15"E), Homalin Township, Sagaing Region, Burma
Thayagon (24°47"N 94°53"E), Homalin Township, Sagaing Region, Burma
Thayagon, Kale, Kale Township, Sagaing Region, Burma